Philip Hardy Smith (May 28, 1931 – May 3, 2020) was an American lawyer, businessman and politician.

Smith was born in Talladega, Alabama and went to Talladega High School. He received his bachelor's degree in biology from Sewanee: The University of the South and his master's degree from the University of Rochester in radiation biology. He received his law degree from the University of Alabama and was admitted to the Alabama bar. Smith practiced law in Talladega. Smith served in the Alabama House of Representatives as a Democrat from 1967 to 1974. He chaired the Talladega County Democratic Central Committee from 1978 to 1989 and served as a municipal judge in Talladega County from 1975 to 1988. Smith died in Tallageda, Alabama.

References

1931 births
2020 deaths
People from Talladega, Alabama
Sewanee: The University of the South alumni
University of Rochester alumni
University of Alabama alumni
Alabama lawyers
Democratic Party members of the Alabama House of Representatives
Alabama state court judges